Kim Min-jung (born 29 July 1986) is a badminton player representing South Korea. Her name is sometimes spelled Kim Min-jeong. As a badminton player, Kim has focused on doubles with Ha Jung-eun; together they competed at the 2008 Beijing Olympics. In the past she has been paired with Hwang Ji-man and Yoo Yeon-seong in mixed doubles.

Career 
At the 2012 Summer Olympics, Kim and her partner Ha Jung-eun, along with Jung Kyung-eun and Kim Ha-na of South Korea, Wang Xiaoli and Yu Yang of China, and Meiliana Jauhari and Greysia Polii of Indonesia were disqualified from the competition for "not using one's best efforts to win a match" and "conducting oneself in a manner that is clearly abusive or detrimental to the sport" following matches the previous evening during which they were accused of trying to lose in order to manipulate the draw. Kim and her partner Ha Jung-eun played against Indonesia's Meiliana Jauhari and Greysia Polii. It is suspected that the Koreans emulated China so to avoid playing against another Korean team in the semi-finals; the Korean head coach Sung Han-kook said "Because they don't want to play the semi-final against each other, so we did the same. We didn't want to play the South Korean team again". South Korea filed an appeal to the case, but it was rejected by the Badminton World Federation.

Achievements

World Cup 
Women's doubles

Asian Games 
Women's doubles

Asian Championships 
Women's doubles

Mixed doubles

Summer Universiade 
Mixed doubles

Asian Junior Championships 
Girls' doubles

BWF Superseries 
The BWF Superseries, launched on 14 December 2006 and implemented in 2007, is a series of elite badminton tournaments, sanctioned by Badminton World Federation (BWF). BWF Superseries has two level such as Superseries and Superseries Premier. A season of Superseries features twelve tournaments around the world, which introduced since 2011, with successful players invited to the Superseries Finals held at the year end.

Women's doubles

  BWF Superseries Finals tournament
  BWF Superseries Premier tournament
  BWF Superseries tournament

BWF Grand Prix 
The BWF Grand Prix has two levels, the Grand Prix Gold and Grand Prix. It is a series of badminton tournaments, sanctioned by the Badminton World Federation (BWF) since 2007.

Women's doubles

Mixed doubles

  BWF Grand Prix Gold tournament
  BWF Grand Prix tournament

BWF International Challenge/Series/Satellite 
Women's doubles

Mixed doubles

  BWF International Challenge tournament
  BWF International Series tournament

Record against selected opponents 
Women's doubles results with Ha Jung-eun against Super Series finalists, Worlds semifinalists, and Olympic quarterfinalists.

  Leanne Choo & Renuga Veeran 2–0
 / Petya Nedelcheva & Anastasia Russkikh 1–0
  Alex Bruce & Michelle Li 1–0
  Du Jing & Yu Yang (badminton) 0–3
  Cheng Shu & Zhao Yunlei 0–4
  Gao Ling & Huang Sui 0–1
  Ma Jin & Wang Xiaoli 0–2
  Tang Jinhua & Xia Huan 0–1
  Tian Qing & Zhao Yunlei 0–4
  Wang Xiaoli & Yu Yang 1–7
  Zhang Yawen & Wei Yili 0–3
  Yang Wei & Zhang Jiewen 0–2
  Cheng Wen-hsing & Chien Yu-chin 3–3
  Christinna Pedersen & Kamilla Rytter Juhl 4–1
  Poon Lok Yan & Tse Ying Suet 2–1
  Jwala Gutta & Ashwini Ponnappa 3–0
  Vita Marissa & Nadya Melati 1–0
  Meiliana Jauhari & Greysia Polii 3–1
  Mizuki Fujii & Reika Kakiiwa 3–3
  Miyuki Maeda & Satoko Suetsuna 3–1
  Kumiko Ogura & Reiko Shiota 1–2
  Shizuka Matsuo & Mami Naito 6–0
  Misaki Matsutomo & Ayaka Takahashi 3–0
  Lee Hyo-jung & Lee Kyung-won 0–2
  Jung Kyung-eun & Kim Ha-na 3–1
  Chin Eei Hui & Wong Pei Tty 3–1
  Valeria Sorokina & Nina Vislova 1–0
  Jiang Yanmei & Li Yujia 1–2
  Shinta Mulia Sari & Yao Lei 6–1
  Michelle Edwards & Annari Viljoen 1–0
  Duanganong Aroonkesorn & Kunchala Voravichitchaikul 1–1

References

External links 

 
 

1986 births
Living people
Sportspeople from Jeju Province
South Korean female badminton players
Badminton players at the 2012 Summer Olympics
Badminton players at the 2008 Summer Olympics
Olympic badminton players of South Korea
Badminton players at the 2010 Asian Games
Asian Games bronze medalists for South Korea
Asian Games medalists in badminton
Medalists at the 2010 Asian Games
Universiade gold medalists for South Korea
Universiade medalists in badminton
Medalists at the 2007 Summer Universiade
21st-century South Korean women